Lady Isabella Moncrieff (1775–1846), who wrote under the name of Martha Blackford, was a Scottish writer who wrote numerous children books.

Biography 
Isabella Moncrieff was the daughter of Reverend Henry Moncrieff-Wellwood and Susan Barclay. In 1803, she married Sir John Stoddart, who was Chief Justice of Malta, and came to also be known as Lady Stoddart.

In 1819, she published her first book The Eskdale Herd-Boy under the pen name of Martha Blackford. The subtitle of the book refers to the aim of "instructing young people" and to this Moncrieff further explained that her purpose was to create characters that could "impress on the minds of her young readers, the permanent advantages of early integrity and gratitude". The American Sunday School Magazine criticised the portrayal of characters that were "not always the most natural" and labelled the work as "deficient" and therefore stated it was not suitable for young audiences. On the other hand, The London Magazine called it "a very superior work, and we have read it ourselves with much interest" and Chronicle of the Times mentioned her as having acquired an "enviable standing in the literary circles".

In 1822 she published The Scottish Orphans: A Moral Tale, which is set at the times of the Jacobite rising of 1745. She explained in the introduction that she was motivated by "having been eagerly solicited by her two nephews" to write again and thinking of the interest the Jacobite rebellion could have in juvenile readers. She then continued to publish moral tales and in a promotion of Annals of the Family of McRoy she restated her "earnest desire to contribute toward improving the principles and correcting the errors of the rising generation". Nevertheless, in Annals of the Family of McRoy she changed her focus to older characters, in this case following two women leaving their maternal home, so as to provide "instruction and amusement" to older audiences.

Most of her novels are set in Scotland. Moncrieff explained that she did this in order to get English readers to have a sense of "the manners and habits of their northern neighbors" and to impress them with "the grandeur of the Scottish scenery".

She died in 1846 and was survived by her husband and numerous children.

Books 
 The Eskdale Herd-Boy (1819)
 The Scottish Orphans: a Moral Tale (1822)
 Arthur Monteith: a Moral Tale (1822)
 Annals of the Family of McRoy (1823)
 The Young Artist (1825)
 William Montgomery (1829)
 The Orphans of Waterloo (1844)

References 

1775 births
1846 deaths
19th-century Scottish writers
Daughters of baronets